Kempston Micro Electronics was an electronics company based in Kempston, Bedfordshire, England specialising in computer joysticks and related home computer peripherals during the 1980s.

The Kempston Interface, a peripheral which allowed a joystick using the de facto Atari joystick port standard to be connected to the ZX Spectrum, was one of the most widely used add-ons to the machine.

Interface 

The Kempston Interface is a joystick interface used on the  ZX Spectrum series of computers that allows controllers complying with the de facto Atari joystick port standard (using the DE-9 connector) to be used with the machine.

The interface itself would be attached to the computer's rear expansion port with a single joystick port on the front or top of the system.

Apart from implementing existing joystick interfacing modes they produced their own standard which delivered the joystick state on the Z80 bus at port 31 (read in BASIC using IN 31).  This meant that the joystick did not produce key-presses like the other standards, such as Cursor, and the method was soon borrowed by other interface manufacturers and became quite popular.

It was one of the most widely supported standards on the machine, coming out as the clear winner against other standards such as Protek and AGF's cursor-based solution and the Fuller standard during the days of the 48K Spectrum.

When Amstrad released the ZX Spectrum +2, the computer featured a built-in joystick interface that was software-compatible with Sinclair's ZX Interface 2 standard. However, the bundled SJS-1 joystick was electrically incompatible with the Atari standard.

Inserting or removing the joystick interface when the computer was turned on was inadvisable as it would almost certainly damage the computer hardware.

Mouse 

 x-axis at port 64479
 y-axis at port 65503
 two buttons at port 64223

Joysticks 

The Formula 1 was based on the Quickshot 1 and released June 1985.

The Score Board features a base similar in size to a 48K Spectrum, with two fire buttons. Released June 1985.

The Competition Pro consisted of a square base, two large red buttons (for left or right-handed use) and a black pommel stick. It used the Atari 2600 standard DE-9 connector and was primary designed to work with the ZX Spectrum Kempston joystick interface but also with the compatible ports built into other home computers such as the Amstrad CPC, Commodore 64 (& VIC-20) and later Commodore Amiga and Atari ST. There was also an Atari 5200 model which leveraged the existing CX52 controller for the keypad functionality.

References 

Defunct manufacturing companies of the United Kingdom
Home computer hardware companies
Game controllers
ZX Spectrum
Electronics companies of the United Kingdom
Kempston
Companies based in Bedfordshire